Richard Dean Anderson (born January 23, 1950) is a retired American actor and producer. He began his television career in 1976, playing Jeff Webber in the American soap opera series General Hospital, and then rose to prominence as the lead actor in the television series MacGyver (1985–1992). He later appeared in films such as Through the Eyes of a Killer (1992), Pandora's Clock (1996), and Firehouse (1997).

In 1997, Anderson returned to television as the lead actor of the series Stargate SG-1, a spin-off of the 1994 film Stargate, replacing actor Kurt Russell. He played the lead from 1997 to 2005 and had a recurring role from 2005 to 2007. Since 1997, he has starred in only one film: Stargate: Continuum, released in 2008 as a sequel film after the Stargate SG-1 film The Ark of Truth. He appeared in the follow-up Stargate spin-off series Stargate: Atlantis and Stargate: Universe (reprising his role from SG-1 as Major General and later Lieutenant General Jack O'Neill).

Early life 
Anderson was born in Minneapolis, Minnesota, the oldest of four sons born to Stuart Jay Anderson, a teacher, and Jocelyn Rhae Carter, an artist. He is of Norwegian, Scottish, Finnish-Swedish, English, German, Swedish and possibly Mohawk descent. His last name, Anderson, derives from his Finnish-Swedish paternal grandfather.

He grew up in Roseville, Minnesota, where he attended Alexander Ramsey High School. As a teenager, his dream of becoming a professional hockey player was ended when he broke both arms three weeks apart while playing hockey for the school team at the age of 18. According to Hockey Hall of Fame member Stan Mikita as of 2009, Anderson was "a hockey nut and pretty damn good hockey player." He developed an early interest in music, art, and acting. For a short time, he tried to become a jazz musician.

Anderson studied to become an actor at St. Cloud State University and then at Ohio University but dropped out before he received his degree because he felt "listless". Right after his junior year in college, he participated with friends in a cross-country bicycle ride from Minnesota to Alaska. He then moved to North Hollywood along with his friend and girlfriend before moving to New York City, finally settling in Los Angeles. He worked as a whale handler in a marine mammal show, as entertainment director at Marineland, a musician in medieval dinner theater, and as a street mime and juggler. He has stated that this period was "the happiest of [his] life" and has expressed an interest in teaching juggling, clowning, and other circus arts to disadvantaged youths.

Career

Early career 
Anderson's first screen role was The Birthday Party, a 1975 short film produced by the Marine Reserve Public Affairs Unit to mark the 200th anniversary of the founding of the United States Marine Corps. Shortly afterwards, Anderson joined the American soap opera, General Hospital as Dr. Jeff Webber from 1976 to 1981. Afterwards, Anderson guest-starred as one half of an interracial couple in an episode of The Facts of Life that also served as a backdoor pilot. In 1982–1983 he starred as Adam in the CBS television series Seven Brides for Seven Brothers (based very loosely on the movie of the same name). In the 1983–1984 season, he played Lieutenant Simon Adams on the 22-week Dennis Weaver series Emerald Point N.A.S. on CBS, paired onscreen with Celia Warren (Susan Dey), the wife of naval lawyer Jack Warren (Charles Frank). Anderson then played Tony Kaiser in the acclaimed TV movie Ordinary Heroes, which aired in 1986.

MacGyver 

Anderson came to fame in the lead role of Angus MacGyver in the hit television series MacGyver, which lasted from 1985 to 1992 and was highly successful throughout its seven-year run. The character Angus MacGyver, also known as just MacGyver or Mac, was an optimistic action hero who was notable for using a Swiss Army knife instead of a firearm as his tool of choice. Anderson stated that he was initially drawn to the role because he "was intrigued by the idea of a TV hero who had an aversion to guns", noting how it differed from popular action heroes of that time and his own aversion to violence.

Anderson would go on to produce two follow-up movies to MacGyver in 1994. After MacGyver ended, Anderson stated "MacGyver was seven years of being in virtually every frame that was shot and having absolutely no life at all."

During the run of the program, Anderson suffered a number of injuries related to doing his own stunt work, some of which required surgery. He suffered a compressed disc in his back when he fell into a hole while filming an episode midway through the first season of the show; he continued filming in a "fairly crippled" state for a year and a half before having surgery that improved his condition, but still experienced pain from the incident. Anderson described it as an "exploded" disc that caused a "severe sciatic condition".

Later career

Stargate 

From 1997 to 2005, Anderson starred as Jack O'Neill in Stargate SG-1, based on the movie Stargate starring Kurt Russell and James Spader. John Symes, president of Metro–Goldwyn–Mayer (MGM), called Anderson himself and asked him if he wanted a part in the series. Anderson watched the Stargate film over and over again and came to the conclusion that the film had "great potential" and signed a contract with the Stargate producers. Anderson agreed to become involved with the project if his character was allowed significantly more comedic leeway than Kurt Russell's character in the feature film. He also requested Stargate SG-1 be more of an ensemble show so that he would not be carrying the plot alone as he did on MacGyver. According to Anderson, he also would ad-lib "a lot of lines to bring a slightly sarcastic humor to the character". In season eight, he chose to have his character "promoted" to base commander on Don S. Davis's advice. This enabled Davis to retire from acting due to his ailing health and Anderson to take over the smaller role which involved far less on-location shooting so that he could spend more time with his young daughter. The following season, Anderson terminated his status as star and producer of Stargate SG-1 opting to make several guest appearances per season instead, allowing his sizable role to be filled by veteran actors Ben Browder (replacing Anderson as field commander), Claudia Black (replacing Anderson as the comic relief) and Emmy nominee Beau Bridges (replacing Anderson as Base commander).

At the Air Force Association's 57th Annual Air Force Anniversary Dinner in Washington, D.C., on September 14, 2004, then-Air Force Chief-of-Staff General John P. Jumper presented Anderson with an award for his role as star and executive producer of Stargate SG-1, a series which portrayed the Air Force in a positive light from its premiere. Anderson was also made an honorary Air Force brigadier general.

Other work 
In 1995, he co-starred with John de Lancie in Legend, a comic series of only twelve episodes about a dime novel writer in the Wild West who, against his will, has to play the role of his own fictional character. Originally written as a TV movie, with the decision to make Legend a series, the original teleplay became the two-hour pilot episode. Anderson was applauded for his roles as Ernest Pratt and Nicodemus Legend by many critics, most notably John O'Connor from The New York Times.

A great fan of the television show The Simpsons, which he repeatedly referenced during his time on SG-1, Anderson was invited in 2005 to guest star on the show. He voiced himself in the episode "Kiss Kiss, Bang Bangalore", in which the actor was kidnapped by Selma and Patty Bouvier, Marge Simpson's sisters, his MacGyver character having been their longstanding heartthrob. Dan Castellaneta, the voice actor who portrays Homer Simpson (among other characters), made a guest appearance on Stargate SG-1 ("Citizen Joe") and, in describing his unnatural ability to see the life events of Jack O'Neill, made reference to O'Neill's fondness for The Simpsons.

Anderson briefly reprised his role as Angus MacGyver in 2006 when he appeared in a MasterCard commercial during Super Bowl XL. While the plot follows the "MacGyver Formula", it is somewhat satirical of the series, showing unlikely if not impossible solutions to the obstacles faced by Anderson's character (in one shot, he cuts through a thick rope with a pine-scented air freshener). The official MasterCard website for the commercial refers to it as "the Return of MacGyver".

Lee David Zlotoff, the creator of MacGyver, announced on May 3, 2008, that a MacGyver film was in production. Anderson expressed interest in revisiting his role; however, the film has not been made or released. 

Anderson cameoed as MacGyver in what seemed to be a Saturday Night Live advertisement parody featuring the show's recurring character MacGruber (portrayed by Will Forte), but was rather a real commercial for both Saturday Night Live and Pepsi, in which the titular character becomes obsessed with the soft drink. This aired three times during the January 31, 2009, SNL broadcast, and the second part aired again during Super Bowl XLIII on the following day.

Anderson has also played the role of General Jack O'Neill in Stargate Atlantis and Stargate Universe, which first aired in October 2009.

Anderson joined the cast of Fairly Legal on USA Network in fall 2010 in the recurring role of David Smith, appearing in three episodes.

Other creative works 
Anderson has served as an executive producer in six shows in which he has acted himself: MacGyver: Lost Treasure of Atlantis, MacGyver: Trail to Doomsday, Legend, Stargate SG-1, Firehouse and From Stargate to Atlantis: Sci Fi Lowdown.

Anderson composed the song "Eau d'Leo" for the MacGyver episode "The Negotiator".

Together with Michael Greenburg, Anderson created the Gekko Film Corporation. The company was involved with Stargate SG-1, producing every episode from 1997 to 2007 with the exception of 2006. The company itself has served as Anderson's backing agency.

Charity work 
Anderson has supported Waterkeeper Alliance, an organization trying to stop water pollution.

Anderson is a member of the Board of Trustees for Challengers Boys and Girls Club, a youth organization established in 1968 with the help of MacGyver producer Stephen Downing, and featured in an episode from season 4 of the show.

Anderson received the 1995 Celebrity Award from the Make-a-Wish Foundation because of his commitment to the foundation. He is also a supporter for various Sclerosis Society non-profit organizations and has done several public service announcements to show his support for the various organizations.

Anderson is an avid supporter of the Special Olympics and was one of many speakers at the 1991 opening ceremonies.

In recent years, Anderson has helped several environmental organizations around the world. He is a member of Board of Advisors of the Sea Shepherd Conservation Society and has worked with the members of the Earth Rivers Expeditions to Produce River Project.

Personal life 
Anderson divides his time among Vancouver, Los Angeles and northern Minnesota. A self-described "winter sports fanatic", he loves hockey and skiing. In 1998, he noted that he "had to slow it down a little bit" due to having "a couple of reconstructed knees." During filming of SG-1, he orchestrated both street and ice hockey games consisting of cast and crew. He was also a race car driver during the MacGyver years.

From 1996 to 2003, his partner was Apryl A. Prose, mother of his only child, Wylie Quinn Annarose Anderson (born on August 2, 1998). Anderson left Stargate SG-1 because he wanted to spend more time with his daughter stating, "Being a father, well, I don't know if this is a change, but it makes me want to get out of here faster. Get off the clock. Just 'cause the baby is my reason for living, my reason for coming to work."

Filmography

Television

Films

Video games

Producer

Composer

Awards

References

External links 

 
 
 
 

1950 births
Living people
20th-century American male actors
21st-century American male actors
American expatriates in Canada
American male film actors
American male soap opera actors
American male television actors
American male voice actors
American people of Finnish descent
American people of Mohawk descent
American people of Norwegian descent
American people of Scottish descent
American people of Swedish descent
Male actors from Minneapolis
Male actors from Minnesota
Ohio University alumni
People from Roseville, Minnesota
Roseville Area High School alumni
St. Cloud State University alumni
Television producers from Minnesota